"365" is a song by German music producer Zedd and American singer Katy Perry. It was released on 14 February 2019 along with its music video, directed by Warren Fu. The song reached number one in Bulgaria and Israel as well as the top 10 in Lebanon, Lithuania, Mexico, and Serbia, the top 20 in Argentina, Estonia, Hungary, Latvia, and the top 30 in the Czech Republic, the Netherlands, Singapore, and Slovenia.

Background
In August 2018, Zedd was the opening act of Perry's Witness: The Tour in Australia and New Zealand. While on tour, the pair worked together on new music, although Zedd was unsure at the time if the collaboration would result in any material. In January 2019, there were rumors about the upcoming release of the song, which was eventually leaked. It was later registered with Universal Music Publishing Group in February, and the song then appeared registered on Shazam before being removed and re-added again. On 13 February, Zedd and Perry began sending emojis to each other on Twitter before Zedd shared the trailer for the video.

Critical reception

Brittany Spanos from Rolling Stone complimented the track and described it as a "breezy, hypnotic love song". Winston Cook-Wilson, in his review for Spin, wrote that "365" was "a featherweight piece of pop-house that luckily does not sound like every other Zedd song the producer has released in recent memory".

Michael Love of Paper praised "365", calling it "a pretty solid pop tune from Zedd and Perry, which of course, is what also helps you stay till the end." According to Mike Nied from Idolator, it had been "perfectly tailored for a Valentine's Day release" with its "sugary sweet lyrics".

Chart performance
In the US, "365" debuted and peaked at number 86 on the Billboard Hot 100, spending a single week on the chart. Additionally, the song reached number one in Israel and Bulgaria, as well as the top ten in Lebanon, Netherlands, Argentina (Anglo Airplay), United States (Hot Dance/Electronic Songs), Australia (Dance), Mexico (Airplay), Netherlands and Lithuania. It also reached the top 20 in Estonia, Hungary, US Dance Club Songs and Greece, and top 40 in Australia, the United Kingdom, Scotland, Romania, Slovakia, Slovenia and Ireland.

Music video
The music video, directed by Warren Fu, was released alongside the song on 14 February. It depicts Perry as a robot and Zedd as a human test subject, where an experiment is conducted to test the two living together. The robot starts falling in love with him, but he does not love her back and distances himself from her. She begins to malfunction because of her heartbreak and is deprogrammed.

Reception
Michael Love Michael of Paper acclaimed the themes and cinematography of the music video. He commented: "Definitely worth crying over if that's what society comes to." Corinne Heller from E! News noted that in the video, "Katy Perry plays a creepily obsessive android." Sam Moore of NME described the video as "sci-fi-indebted". Idolators Mike Nied praised it as "essential viewing". Conversely, Winston Cook-Wilson of Spin stated that "Mostly, one just wonders if the money could have been spent better."

Track listing
Digital download and streaming
"365"

Digital download and streaming (Remixes)
"365" (Zedd remix)
"365" (Jonas Aden remix)
"365" (Ellis remix)
"365" (Kuuro remix)

Credits and personnel
Credits adapted from Tidal.
 Zedd – songwriter, producer, mixer, studio personnel
 Katy Perry – vocals, songwriter
 Daniel Davidsen – songwriter
 Corey Sanders – songwriter
 Peter Wallevik – songwriter
 Caroline Ailin – songwriter
 Mich Hansen – songwriter
 Cutfather – producer
 PhD – producer
 Mike Marsh – mastering engineer, studio personnel
 Ryan Shanahan – engineer, studio personnel

Charts

Weekly charts

Year-end charts

Certifications

Release history

References

2019 singles
2019 songs
Katy Perry songs
Zedd songs
Song recordings produced by Cutfather
Songs written by Katy Perry
Songs written by Zedd
Songs written by Daniel Davidsen
Songs written by Caroline Ailin
Songs written by Cutfather
Songs written by Peter Wallevik
Number-one singles in Israel
Number-one singles in Portugal
Music videos directed by Warren Fu